Musaeus College is a Buddhist private  girls' school in Colombo, Sri Lanka. The school is named after its founding principal, Marie Musaeus Higgins (1855 – 10 July 1926) from Wismar, Germany, who served as the school's principal from 1891 to 1926. Musaeus College provides primary and secondary education to more than 6,500 girls from ages 3 to 18, and is managed by a board of trustees. The school's motto is "Follow the Light".

Early history 

The origin of the school can be traced to the Women's Education Society of Ceylon, whose mission was to improve educational opportunities for girls, with instruction in English along with Buddhist principles. It had the backing of the Buddhist Theosophical Society, which previously founded the Ananda College for boys along similar lines. With help and guidance from Peter De Abrew and Colonel Henry Steel Olcott, they founded the Sangamitta Girls' School at Tichborne Place, Maradana, around 1890, and wanted a European lady as its Principal. Colonel Olcott found a suitable candidate in Kate F. Pickett, the daughter of Elise Pickett, President of the Melbourne Theosophical Society. Pickett arrived in Colombo on 10 June 1891 and had apparently settled into life in the school's boarding house when she was found on the morning of 24 June 1891 drowned in a well in the school grounds.

Marie Musaeus Higgins, after whom the college was subsequently named, was the daughter of Theodor Musaeus, Chief Justice of Wismar in Mecklenburg, Germany. After having graduated and obtaining the title of Frau Professor, she proceeded to the United States of America and was engaged in educational work there. She married Anton Higgins, an engineer in the US army and a Theosophist. He died less than four years later. Following an advertisement by Col. Olcott in The Path (the magazine of the Buddhist Theosophical Society), she left for Ceylon, arriving on 15 November 1891.

The Musaeus Buddhist Girls' School started in a very simple and modest ‘mud hut’ which served both as living and teaching quarters with 12 students. The ‘hut’ was replaced by a brick building in the year 1895 as a result of a donation from Mr. Wilton Hack. He was a recent convert to Theosophy and around 1892, while in Colombo on his way home to Australia, Hack observed the work being carried out by Higgins ("Sudu Amma" to her students), and decided to become involved in its development. He was to remain on the board of trustees until his death in 1923.

The lack of sufficient classrooms had stood in the way of Government assistance. Whenever Higgins had approached Mr. J. B. Cull, Director of Public Instruction, for funds she was told that without a permanent building she was ineligible for a Grant. Once the fine new hall with its upper storey to serve as a teaching hall and extra dormitory was completed, an annual Government grant to the school followed.

Teachers’ Training School

The demand for women teachers for Sinhalese Buddhist Girls’ schools being great, Higgins was approached by the Manager of those schools to open a Training College to train women students as school teachers. This work was begun in 1908 with the approval and sanction of the Government. This college was now sending out annually a number of trained teachers as Head-Mistresses of Buddhist Sinhalese Girls’ Schools, situated out of Colombo.
There was a Practicing School attached to the Training College. Not only did it form and indispensable adjunct to the college, but also the mean of giving a free education in Sinhalese to the children in the neighborhood. The work of the Musaeus Buddhist Girls’ College was thus confined to:-

English College
Kindergarten on Modern Lines
Training College for women (Sinhalese)
Practising School (Sinhalese)
Works on Buddhism

Higgins’ historical studies induced her to study Buddhism and in her later years Higgins was engaged in the task of compiling books on Buddhism “Poya Days” and “Jataka Mala” (a translation of the Jataka Stories) are two of her popular books.
Higgins had planned to issue a series of plays called “Ceylon Historical Plays”. She published one or two of them and they were even acted out under her own supervision by the girls of Musaeus College. Her simplicity of style had a special appeal to children for whom most of her books were written.

As a social religious worker, Higgins was held in high esteem. Her life was entirely devoted to the cause, which she represented. In later years, she was not in the best of health-due to a life of strenuous hard work. The climate of Colombo did not agree with her and during the greater part of the year she lived at “Musaeus Cottage”, Diyatalawa. Later she was compelled to give up the Principalship of the school and become the Director.

During the last few days Higgins was seriously ill. She had more than one relapse and her condition continued to give anxiety. At the time of her death, her niece, Miss. Schneider who arrived from Germany, was personally looking after her, and was by her bedside when she died at the age of 71.

At a time when Western influences were becoming widespread, Higgins encouraged her students to uphold their traditional customs, manners and culture. She made religious activities an integral part of the school curriculum.

After 33 years of service Higgins died in 1926.

‘Founder-Father’ of Musaeus

Peter De Abrew was the eldest son of William de Abrew. He was one of the pioneers of the Theosophical Society of Ceylon. De Abrew became actively involved in the movement started by Colonel Henry Olcott and others towards the regeneration of the Sinhala nation, its religion and culture which had deteriorated during the last decades of the 19th Century together with his father, William de Abrew, who was himself a member of this movement donated their own land to build a Buddhist Girls’ School. Higgins and de Abrew started their school in 1891, in a little thatched mud-walled hut where Musaeus stands now.

In 1940 Peter De Abrew died at the age of 78.

Musaeus College Traditions

Motto :

The school motto has always been "පදීපං ගවේසථ" (pronounced: "padeepang gavae satha") which means "Follow the light". Higgins gave the motto so that Buddhist girls attending the college will always be focused, following the "path of light" or words of wisdom by Lord Buddha at the same time being moulded in to educated young ladies during the girls' time in college.

School Anthem
 
After the school was founded in 1891, a school anthem was first composed in 1893. This anthem: "what joy to sing Lord Buddha's praise" was sung in English. Later as years' passed by, the Anthem was translated to Sinhala as "නමදිමු මියුසියස් විදුහල් මවුනි" (Translation : let us worship mother Musaeus & Pronounced: Namadhimu Musaeus Widhuhal Mawuni) by the eminent Sri Lankan poet Madawala S Rathnayake and the music was composed by maestro Pandit W. D. Amaradeva. This is the school anthem sung by Musaeites today, to praise their alma-mater and the school's founder, Marie Musaeus Higgins.

Traditions Followed in Mornings

Children in all classes will worship Lord Buddha every morning by offering flowers before the class teacher arrives. Before the first period of study begins, "pansil" or the five Lay Vows or the five precepts are offered. Apart from this tradition, a 5- to 10-minute meditation session is offered for students several days a week, to enhance their mind for education and to give them a fresh start at the beginning of the week.
(In case of the presence of girls' who are non-Buddhist, which is usually a rare exception: they would be given the freedom to recall their own religious learning during this time in the morning)

Prefectorial System

Prefectships are awarded to senior and outstanding personalities in all three sections: The Primary (Grades 1–5), Middle School Section (Grades 6–8) and the Senior Section (9-13).

 
All prefects will support the college by completing the assigned duties and by taking charge of discipline of other students in their respective sections. They are entitled to wear the badges on daily basis during their time of appointment.

Houses
Students are categorized into four houses on enrollment. Each of the houses are named after four founding members of the college: Marie Musaeus Higgins, Henry Olcott,  Peter De Abrew & Annie Besant. The houses are led by House Captains, competing in all sports and aesthetic activities to win the inter-house championship. The houses are:

Principals

Religious education and training 

Buddhism has a pre-eminent place in all school programmes, and is a compulsory subject in the curriculum in all grades.
The school day begins with a “Bakti-Gee” in veneration of the Buddha, followed by “Pansil”. On the last bell, three “Gathas” are recited paying homage to the Buddha, Dhamma and Sangha. Flowers are offered daily by different classes at the College Shrine Room.
Once a month, a learned Bhikku is invited to deliver a sermon to both teachers and pupils. An endeavour is made to inspire the students with the tenets of Buddhism and train them according to the Buddhist way of life.

Teaching of English 
Special emphasis is given to the teaching of English language. English medium classes are conducted from Grade 4 up to Advanced Level classes.
The teaching programme includes training in Speech, in addition to Courses prescribed by the Ministry of Education. The student is also introduced to Literature and reading through a reading programme conducted during school hours.

Notable alumni

Notable teachers
Iranganie Serasinghe

References
 An short historical sketch of the Musæus Buddhist Girl's College; Buddhist Annual of Ceylon, Vol 1 (1920), 1, p. 27

External links
Official website
Principal Musaeus College (1995-2008)

1891 establishments in Ceylon
Buddhist schools in Sri Lanka
Girls' schools in Sri Lanka
Educational institutions established in 1891
Private schools in Sri Lanka
Schools in Colombo